Christine Spiten (born March 20, 1990) is a Norwegian sailing champion, Engineer and Co-founder of Blueye Robotics. She is also Co-Captain of EntrepreneurShip One.

Education 
Spiten earned a M.Sc in Industrial Economics and Technology Management from the Norwegian University of Life Sciences.

She holds an underwater robotics degree from Federal University of Rio de Janeiro and studied International Entrepreneurship at University of California, Berkeley as part of the Gründerskolen programme.

Professional career 
In 2012 Spiten was interning at a company called Kongsberg when she first learned about underwater ROVs. used in the IEM-project. Intrigued by the limited access to explore and experience the ocean, she moved to San Francisco to learn about entrepreneurship and underwater technology.

In 2015, Spiten co-founded an underwater drone company, Blueye Robotics, together with Erik Dyrkoren, Martin Ludvigsen and Erik Haugane.

In January 2019, Blueye Robotic had raised $10 million to date, and grown the team to 26 employees with offices in Trondheim and Oslo.

Spiten made a public TED-talk at the event TEDxTrondheim in 2018.

According to Forbes, her key connections are Anita Schjøll Brede, Erna Solberg, Odd Reitan, Johann Johannson and Arne Wilhelmsen.

Awards and honors 

 2007: Norwegian Sailing Champion, Asker Seilforening
2017: Selected as Norway's 50 most important female tech founders.
 2018: 
 Selected as Forbes "30 under 30"
 Selected as World's Top 50 Women In Technology
 Selected as top 10 of Norwegian Female Tech-Entrepreneurs

References

External links
 

Living people
21st-century Norwegian engineers
Norwegian women engineers
21st-century women engineers
Federal University of Rio de Janeiro alumni
Norwegian University of Life Sciences alumni
University of California, Berkeley alumni
1990 births
Norwegian women company founders